Francis John Fraschilla (born August 30, 1958) is an American basketball commentator and former college basketball coach.

Career
Fraschilla was an assistant coach at University of Rhode Island for Jack Kraft, Ohio University for Danny Nee and Billy Hahn, Ohio State University for Hall of Fame Coach Gary Williams and Providence College for current University of Tennessee coach Rick Barnes. He then served as head men's basketball coach at Manhattan College, St. John's University, and the University of New Mexico before joining ESPN as a broadcast analyst. He currently serves as a game analyst on Big Monday broadcasts, covering primarily Big 12 action, and as a studio analyst for ESPN college basketball programming. He also covers the NBA draft, focusing mostly on foreign players. His co-broadcaster on many Big 12 games previously was Brent Musburger. Fraschilla also serves as ESPN's analyst for its broadcasts of FIBA tournaments.

Personal life

Born in Brooklyn, Fraschilla is the oldest of seven children. He attended James Madison High School (Brooklyn) and graduated from Brooklyn College. His son, James Fraschilla, played for the University of Oklahoma men's basketball team and was nominated for the Big 12 Sportsperson of the Year Award. James is on the basketball staff of the Orlando Magic. His younger son, Matthew Fraschilla, played basketball at Harvard University where he is currently serving as an assistant coach.

Head coaching record

References

External links
 ESPN profile

1958 births
Living people
American men's basketball coaches
American people of Italian descent
Basketball coaches from New York (state)
Brooklyn College alumni
College basketball announcers in the United States
College men's basketball head coaches in the United States
James Madison High School (Brooklyn) alumni
Manhattan Jaspers basketball coaches
National Basketball Association broadcasters
New Mexico Lobos men's basketball coaches
Ohio Bobcats men's basketball coaches
Ohio State Buckeyes men's basketball coaches
Providence Friars men's basketball coaches
Rhode Island Rams men's basketball coaches
Sportspeople from Brooklyn
St. John's Red Storm men's basketball coaches